Imberdown is an electoral division of West Sussex in the United Kingdom, and returns one member to sit on West Sussex County Council.

Extent
The division covers the western part of the town of East Grinstead and the village of Crawley Down.

It comprises the following Mid Sussex District wards: the northern part of Crawley Down & Turners Hill Ward and East Grinstead Imberhorne Ward; and of the following civil parishes: the northwestern part of East Grinstead, and the eastern part of Worth.

Election results

2021 Election
Results of the election held on 8 May 2021:

2017 Election
Results of the election held on 4 May 2017:

2013 Election
Results of the election held on 2 May 2013:

2009 Election
Results of the election held on 4 June 2009:

2005 Election
Results of the election held on 5 May 2005:

References
Election Results - West Sussex County Council

External links
 West Sussex County Council
 Election Maps

Electoral Divisions of West Sussex